City Hall·Yongin University Station is a station of the Everline in Samga-dong, Cheoin-gu, Yongin, South Korea. As its name suggests, Yongin City Hall is in front of the station.

External links
  Station information from Everline

Everline
Metro stations in Yongin
Railway stations opened in 2013